MV Sewol (Hangul:
세월호, Hanja:世越號, Beyond the World) was a South Korean vehicle-passenger ferry, built and previously operated in Japan. She operated between Incheon and Jeju.  On 16 April 2014, Sewol capsized and sank with the loss of 306 passengers and crew.

Description
Sewol was a RoPax ferry that was built by the Japanese company Hayashikane Shipbuilding & Engineering Co. Ltd. in 1994. The ferry had a legal capacity for 180 vehicles and 154 regular cargo containers.

Operations

The ferry was originally known as Ferry Naminoue between 1994 and 2012, and had been operated in Japan for almost 18 years without any accidents. In 2012, the ship was later bought for  billion ( million) by Chonghaejin Marine Company, controlled by the family of businessman Yoo Byung-eun. The ship was renamed Sewol, and refurbished. Modifications included adding extra passenger cabins on the third, fourth, and fifth decks, raising the passenger capacity by 117, and increasing the weight of the ship by 239 tons. After regulatory and safety checks by the Korean Register of Shipping, the ship began her operation in South Korea on 15 March 2013. The ship made three round-trips every week from Incheon to Jeju. In February 2014 it was reported that Sewol again passed a vessel safety inspection by the South Korean Coast Guard following an intermediate survey to ensure the ship remained in a general condition which satisfied requirements set by the Korean Register of Shipping.

Sinking

On the evening of 15 April 2014, Sewol departed Incheon for a standard overnight crossing to Jeju Island. The ferry was crewed by a complement of 33 and was carrying 443 passengers, 325 of whom were second-year students from Danwon High School in Ansan. Of the 476 people on board, there were only 172 survivors. 304 of those on board died, 250 of whom were Danwon students.

The South Korea government's Board of Audit and Inspection revealed that the Korean Register's licensing was based on falsified documents. After the incident, the company reported that the ship was carrying 124 cars, 56 trucks, and 1157 tons of cargo. The amount of cargo carried was twice the legal limit.

On 12 February 2015, Kim Kyung-il, the coastguard captain responsible for rescue efforts, was sentenced to four years in prison for negligence and falsified reporting.

Salvage

In April 2015, a technical report concluded that it was feasible to raise the wreck of Sewol and President Park said she hoped that it would be carried out as soon as possible. Following the receipt of tenders from salvage companies, it was announced on 15 July 2015 that a consortium led by China's Shanghai Salvage Company was the favoured bidder, at a cost of 85.1 billion won (US$74.6 million).

On 22 March 2017, salvage operation began to raise the wreck of sunken Sewol. The vessel was raised on 23 March. The wreck was moved onshore at Mokpo on 12 April. The vessel was searched for the remains of the nine missing victims.

While the lifted ferry was transported on board a semi-submersible vessel, her weight was estimated to be 17,000 tonnes, including the contribution of remaining mud inside. In terms of weight and number of axle-lines (600), it doubled the world record for a transport by SPMTs.

Notes

References

 
Ferries of South Korea
1994 ships